Georgina is a  steam locomotive built by North Bay Railway Engineering Services in 2016 for Scarborough, North Yorkshire's North Bay Railway. She was the first steam locomotive to run on the line.

Construction
Georgina is based on the W. G. Bagnall's  gauge Sipat class and is built to the  gauge of the North Bay Railway. The original Sipat locomotive was built for the Sipat Water Works in India.

The North Bay Railway Engineering Services built Georgina over three years, starting in 2013. She was their first complete steam locomotive.

North Bay Railway 
Georgina was named in a ceremony by BBC newsreader Harry Gration in March 2016. Her first passenger service was on 23 March 2016. In September 2021, the North Bay Railway was purchased by new owners who decided to put Georgina up for sale.

The Princess Royal Class Locomotive Trust 
In December 2021, Georgina was sold to The Princess Royal Class Locomotive Trust operating at the Midland Railway Centre.

References 

0-4-0ST locomotives
Individual locomotives of Great Britain
Preserved narrow gauge steam locomotives of Great Britain
Railway locomotives introduced in 2016